Shanghai Mini was released in 1999 in Japan by SNK for the Neo Geo Pocket Color. Contrary to popular misconception, Shanghai Mini was also released in the United States.

This game is essentially a Mah Jong\Taipei\Shanghai game for the system.

External links

1999 video games
Mahjong video games
Neo Geo Pocket Color games
SNK games
Video games developed in Japan